Artilleriregementet is a Swedish regimental name that has been used by the following units:
Artilleriregementet (old), artillery regiment (1636–1794)
Artilleriregementet (new), artillery regiment (2000–)